Lady Elizabeth Sarah Lavinia McCorquodale (née Spencer; born 19 March 1955) is one of the two older sisters of Diana, Princess of Wales, the other being Jane Fellowes, Baroness Fellowes.

Early life
Elizabeth Sarah Lavinia Spencer was born with the honorific "The Honourable"; she acquired the courtesy title "Lady" in 1975, when her grandfather died and her father became the 8th Earl Spencer. She suffered from the eating disorder anorexia nervosa in her early twenties. She was educated firstly at Riddlesworth Hall School in Norfolk and secondly at West Heath boarding school near Sevenoaks in Kent. After passing O Level exams, she left West Heath to work in London.

Family
Sarah married Neil Edmund McCorquodale (born 4 October 1951), son of Alastair McCorquodale and Rosemary Sybil Turnor, on 17 May 1980 in Northamptonshire, England. Neil is a 2nd cousin once removed of Lady Sarah's stepmother, Raine Spencer.

Neil and Lady Sarah McCorquodale have three children:

Emily Jane McCorquodale (2 July 1983); she married James T. R. Hutt on 9 June 2012. They have two children:
Isabella Rosemary Hutt (18 June 2014)
Henry George Thomas Hutt (25 March 2016)
George Edmund McCorquodale (17 November 1984); he married Bianca Moore, daughter of Gavin Moore, on 6 August 2016 in South Africa.
Sybil McCorquodale (12 May 2017)
Molly McCorquodale (31 January 2020)
Joseph McCorquodale (30 March 2022) 
Celia Rose McCorquodale (1989); she married George Woodhouse on 16 June 2018 at St Andrew and St Mary's Church, Stoke Rochford, Lincolnshire, England. For her wedding, Celia wore the Spencer Tiara, which her mother and aunts Jane and Diana wore on their wedding days.
Walter George Spencer Woodhouse (27 November 2020)

Lady Sarah is the aunt to William, Prince of Wales, and Prince Harry, Duke of Sussex.

Career
She and her family reside near Grantham, Lincolnshire, where she served a one-year term as High Sheriff of Lincolnshire in 2009. She became a master of the Belvoir Hunt in May 2010. Lady Sarah was also president of the Diana, Princess of Wales Memorial Fund, which raised £100 million for various charities. The Fund unsuccessfully took legal action in 1998 against the Franklin Mint over the unlicensed use of Diana's image. The Fund closed at the end of 2012.

Relationships

Charles, Prince of Wales
In 1977, Lady Sarah's relationship with Prince Charles led to the first meeting between Diana and her future husband. Lady Sarah later commented on her sister's marriage, saying: "I introduced them. I'm Cupid." During the period in which Lady Sarah dated the Prince, she allegedly met two reporters, James Whittaker and Nigel Nelson, at a restaurant, and gave them an exclusive report on her royal connection. 

Lady Sarah is said to have admitted to having been diagnosed with anorexia, having "thousands of boyfriends," a past problem involving alcohol, and having started keeping a scrapbook of all the press clippings about her royal romance that she intended to "show" future grandchildren. "Her head seemed to be turned by the publicity," the two reporters later said. Lady Sarah also declared that she would not marry Charles "if he were the dustman or the King of England." When the article was released, Lady Sarah showed it to the prince, who was infuriated by it. The relationship dissolved soon after that. Some have stated the relationship between her and Diana was strained, because of her long resentment of the Prince marrying Diana and not her, though others (including Diana's biographer Andrew Morton) have said Lady Sarah was one of the few people Diana trusted. Later in their lives, Lady Sarah often accompanied Diana on official visits as one of her ladies-in-waiting.

Upon the death of Diana on 31 August 1997, Lady Sarah flew to Paris with her younger sister, Jane, and Prince Charles to accompany Diana's body back to England. She contributed to the readings at Diana's funeral. Lady Sarah was also co-executor of Diana's will and president of the Diana, Princess of Wales Memorial Fund. Lady Sarah attended the wedding of her nephew Prince William to Catherine Middleton on 29 April 2011. It is said that William and Catherine are close to Lady Sarah, with whom they spent a weekend on the 16th anniversary of Diana's death. Lady Sarah also attended the wedding of her other nephew, Prince Harry, to Meghan Markle on 19 May 2018.

Friends
In 2018, Lady Sarah spoke publicly in support of George Grant, an employee of Belvoir Hunt whom she had known for 27 years, after he assaulted two hunt monitors. Grant, along with his son and other men, assaulted the hunt monitors who were affiliated with the League Against Cruel Sports. Lady Sarah, who served as joint master of the Belvoir Hunt, claimed that Grant's actions were out of character.

References

Bibliography

External links
 Lady Sarah McCorquodale picture Lady Sarah McCorquodale leaving the high court at her sisters (Diana, Princess of Wales) inquest.
 Lady Sarah McCorquodale photo The Princess Royal and Lady Sarah McCorquodale during the prize giving ceremony at Burghley Horse Trials.

1955 births
Living people
Sarah
Sarah McCorquodale
British ladies-in-waiting
Daughters of British earls
Place of birth missing (living people)
High Sheriffs of Lincolnshire
People from Stoke Rochford